The Gazet van Antwerpen Trophy Cyclo cross 2006–2007 started November 1 with de Koppenbergcross and ended February 18 with Sluitingsprijs Oostmalle.

Men results

Ranking (top 10)

Women results

See also
 2006/07 UCI Cyclo-cross World Cup
 2006/07 Cyclo-cross Superprestige
 Cyclo-cross Gazet van Antwerpen

External links
 Cyclo-cross.info 
 Gazet van Antwerpen Trofee

Cyclo-cross BPost Bank Trophy
Gazet van Antwerpen
Gazet van Antwerpen